Joseph Bost (born August 4, 1956) is a former member of the 1976 US Judo Olympic Team.  At the Olympics he lost in the first round.

References 

Olympic judoka of the United States
Judoka at the 1976 Summer Olympics
American male judoka
Living people
1956 births